
Howard Husock is vice president for policy research at the Manhattan Institute, where he is also director of its Social Entrepreneurship Initiative and a contributing editor to the Institute's quarterly magazine, City Journal. He is the author of the blog Philanthropy and Society on Forbes.com and author of the book Philanthropy Under Fire.

Husock was nominated for the Corporation for Public Broadcasting Board of Directors by President Barack Obama in June 2013 and confirmed by the Senate in August 2013. From 1987 through 2006, Husock served as director of case studies in public policy and management at Harvard University's Kennedy School of Government, where he was also a fellow at the Hauser Center for Nonprofit Organizations. His publications on the nonprofit sector have appeared in The Wall Street Journal, National Affairs, Society Magazine, The Chronicle of Philanthropy, The Public Interest, The New York Times, and the Washington Post. In addition, Husock has written widely on housing and urban policy, including in his book, The Trillion-Dollar Housing Mistake: The Failure of American Housing Policy (Ivan R. Dee, 2003) and his monograph Repairing the Ladder: Toward a New Housing Policy Paradigm (Reason Foundation, 1996). His work has also appeared in the Journal of Policy Analysis and Management, Philanthropy, and The Wilson Quarterly. Husock is a former broadcast journalist and documentary filmmaker whose work at WGBH-TV in Boston won three Emmy awards.

His WGBH series Community Disorder: Racial Violence in Boston (1979) won the Robert F. Kennedy Journalism award for television. His WGBH credits include The Paterson Project: One City in the Reagan Era (1982);  Pat Ewing and an American Dream (1981); Meet Tom Menino (1983);  The World Halfball Tournament (1983) and America’s First School: 350 Years at Boston Latin (1984).

Personal life
Husock is a graduate of the Boston University School of Public Communication and was a 1981-82 mid-career fellow at Princeton University's Woodrow Wilson School of Public and International Affairs. He is married to ceramic sculptor Robin Henschel and the father of three adult sons. He currently resides with his wife in New York.

Philanthropy Under Fire
In Philanthropy Under Fire, Husock advocates for independent philanthropy by private entities over government intervention to relieve societal ills. significant political and intellectual challenges which threaten it today.

References

External links
 

Articles
 Huscok's articles (via Manhattan Institute)

Blog
 Forbes.com's "Philanthropy and Society"

Books
 Philanthropy Under Fire,   
 America's Trillion-Dollar Housing Mistake: The Failure of American Housing Policy, 2003

Research
 Let's Break Up the Big Cities Civic Bulletin 14, May 1998

Testimony
 Testimony by Husock on How Housing Policy can Reduce Dependency – and Poverty, 08-01-12       
 Testimony of Husock before the Senate Judiciary Committee, 07-21-10

Living people
American male journalists
American political writers
Boston University College of Communication alumni
Jewish American writers
Princeton School of Public and International Affairs alumni
Manhattan Institute for Policy Research
Year of birth missing (living people)
21st-century American Jews